Kajymukan Munaitpasov Stadium (Qajymuqan Muńaıtpasuly) is a multi-purpose stadium in Shymkent, Kazakhstan.  It is currently used mostly for football matches. It is home of the football club FC Ordabasy who is playing in Kazakhstan Premier League, Kazakhstan's top division of football. The stadium has a capacity of 20,000 people.

The stadium is named after Kazhymukan Munaitpasov, a Kazakh wrestler and repeated World Champion in Greco-Roman wrestling.

Football venues in Kazakhstan
Multi-purpose stadiums in Kazakhstan
Sport in Shymkent